El Capitan is a mountain summit in the Bitterroot Range of Montana. The peak is located in the Selway-Bitterroot Wilderness on land managed by the Bitterroot National Forest. The summit lies 12 miles west of the town of Darby, Montana, and three miles east of the Idaho–Montana border. The highest point of the Central Bitterroot Range is line parent Trapper Peak, 9.3 miles south-southeast.

Climate

Based on the Köppen climate classification, the peak is located in a subarctic climate zone characterized by long, usually very cold winters, and mild summers. Winter temperatures can drop below −10 °F with wind chill factors below −30 °F.

Gallery

References

External links
 El Capitan (photo): Flickr

Bitterroot Range
Mountains of Montana
Mountains of Ravalli County, Montana
North American 2000 m summits
Bitterroot National Forest